Yaseen Margro (born 12 February 2000) is a South African water polo player. He competed in the 2020 Summer Olympics.

References

2000 births
Living people
Water polo players at the 2020 Summer Olympics
South African male water polo players
Olympic water polo players of South Africa